Toni Tipurić (born 10 September 1990) is a Bosnia and Herzegovina-born Austrian professional footballer who plays as a defender.

International career
Tipurić was part of the Bosnia and Herzegovina U19 squad at the 2014 UEFA European Under-19 Championship qualifying round but remained on the bench in all three games.

Honours
Levadia Tallinn
Meistriliiga: 2014

References

External links

1990 births
Living people
Austrian footballers
Association football defenders
Meistriliiga players
FCI Levadia Tallinn players
Slovak Super Liga players
FC ViOn Zlaté Moravce players
Croatian Football League players
HNK Cibalia players
CS Concordia Chiajna players
Liga I players
FK Shkupi players
Macedonian First Football League players
Austrian expatriate footballers
Expatriate footballers in Germany
Expatriate footballers in Estonia
Expatriate footballers in Romania
Expatriate footballers in Slovakia
Austrian expatriate sportspeople in Germany
Austrian expatriate sportspeople in Estonia
Austrian expatriate sportspeople in Romania
Austrian expatriate sportspeople in Slovakia